Hartapu was an Anatolian king in  the 8th century BCE. He is known from Hieroglyphic Luwian inscriptions from Kizildağ, Mount Karadağ, Burunkaya near Aksaray, and most recently Türkmen-Karahöyük, site of a monumental stele in which he claimed victory over the kingdom of Phrygia, ruled around that time by King Midas. 

Hartapu, who bore the titles Great king, and Hero, states himself to be the son of another Great King and Hero named Mursili.

If Hartapu is the son of Mursili III, he may have succeeded his uncle Kurunta, the younger brother of Mursili III as king of Tarḫuntašša in the 2nd half of the 13th century BC. Hartapu's use of royal titulation may have been similar to its use by to Kurunta, who also bore the titles Great King and Hero to demonstrate his right to the throne of Hattusa, still occupied by the descendants of the usurper Ḫattušili III. Those descendants were Tudhaliya IV during Kurunta's reign, and Suppiluliuma II during Hartapu's reign.

It is known that Suppiluliuma II, last known Great King of Hattusa and usurper from Hartapu's point of view, conquered Tarhuntassa during a military campaign. This may have brought Hartapu's reign to an end. Tarhuntassa may have been ruled by the great king of Hattusa again and collapsed together with the rest of the Hittite empire.

Tarhuntassa may have survived the collapse of the Hittite empire. Possible evidence is given by a Hieroglyphic Luwian inscription from Karahöyük in south-central Anatolia. In this an inscription dated to the (later?) 12th century BC, a certain Armanani informs about a visit of a great king named Ir-Teššub in the land POCULUM, at which event the great king gave control of three cities within the country of POCULUM to Armanani. It is sure that Ir-Teššub was a Great King, but his country is unknown. One hypothesis is that he was a Great King of Carchemish and successor of Kuzi-Teššub. The other hypothesis is that he may in fact have been a Great King of Tarhuntassa. This hypothesis is based on epigraphic similarities between the inscription from Karahöyük and the inscriptions of Hartapu. This would imply that the royal line represented by Hartapu continued at least to the early Iron Age.

In 2019, a farmer near the site of Türkmen-Karahöyük discovered a stone stele commissioned by Hartapu to commemorate his victory over Phrygia written in Luwian Hieroglyphics. Archaeologists from the University of Chicago joined the Konya Regional Archaeological Survey Project to excavate the stele, and the excavations of the archaeological mound at the site, which is believed to be the capital of Hartapu's as yet unnamed kingdom, will continue in 2020. Luwian hieroglyphs have been found on the stone stele in a canal next to the ancient mound of Türkmen-Karahöyük, describing the military victory of "Great King Hartapu" over an alliance of 13 kings, dating from the 8th century B.C. The description has a reference to defeating the royal house of Phrygia, which included King Midas.

See also
 Luwian people
 Luwian language
 Hieroglyphic Luwian

Literature 

 Trevor Bryce: The World of the Neo-Hittite Kingdoms: A Political and Military History. Oxford University Press: Oxford, New York 2012.

References 

Hittite kings
13th-century BC rulers